The 2022 Nottingham Open (also known as the Rothesay Open Nottingham for sponsorship purposes) was a professional tennis tournament played on outdoor grass courts. It was the 14th edition of the event for women and the 26th edition for men. It was classified as a WTA 250 on the 2022 WTA Tour for the women, and as an ATP Challenger Tour event for the men. The event took place at the Nottingham Tennis Centre in Nottingham, United Kingdom from 6 through 12 June 2022.

Champions

Men's singles

  Dan Evans def.  Jordan Thompson 6–4, 6–4.

Women's singles

  Beatriz Haddad Maia def.  Alison Riske, 6–4, 1–6, 6–3

This was Haddad Maia's maiden WTA Tour singles title.

Men's doubles

  Jonny O'Mara /  Ken Skupski def.  Julian Cash /  Henry Patten 3–6, 6–2, [16–14].

Women's doubles

  Beatriz Haddad Maia /  Zhang Shuai def.  Caroline Dolehide /  Monica Niculescu 7–6(7–2), 6–3

ATP singles main-draw entrants

Seeds

 1 Rankings are as of 23 May 2022.

Other entrants
The following players received wildcards into the main draw:
  Dan Evans
  Alastair Gray
  Paul Jubb

The following player received entry into the singles main draw as a special exempt:
  Jordan Thompson

The following player received entry into the singles main draw as an alternate:
  Duje Ajduković

The following players received entry from the qualifying draw:
  Antoine Bellier
  Marius Copil
  Daniel Cox
  Jason Jung
  Henri Squire
  Otto Virtanen

WTA singles main-draw entrants

Seeds

 1 Rankings are as of 23 May 2022.

Other entrants
The following players received wildcards into the main draw:
  Jodie Burrage
  Sonay Kartal
  Emma Raducanu
  Maria Sakkari

The following players received entry from the qualifying draw:
  Katie Boulter
  Cristina Bucșa
  Katarzyna Kawa
  Yuriko Miyazaki
  Eden Silva
  Daria Snigur

The following player received entry using a special ranking:
  Tatjana Maria

Withdrawals
Before the tournament
  Sorana Cîrstea → replaced by  Katie Volynets
  Alizé Cornet → replaced by  Rebecca Marino
  Ons Jabeur → replaced by  Zhu Lin
  Sofia Kenin → replaced by  Heather Watson
  Ana Konjuh → replaced by  Tatjana Maria
  Jessica Pegula → replaced by  Wang Qiang
  Elena-Gabriela Ruse → replaced by  Donna Vekić
  Clara Tauson → replaced by  Harriet Dart

WTA doubles main-draw entrants

Seeds

1 Rankings are as of 23 May 2022.

Withdrawals
Before the tournament
  Monica Niculescu /  Elena-Gabriela Ruse → replaced by  Caroline Dolehide /  Monica Niculescu
  Xu Yifan /  Yang Zhaoxuan → replaced by  Alicia Barnett /  Olivia Nicholls

References

External links
 Website

2022 WTA Tour
2022 ATP Challenger Tour
2022
2022 in English tennis
June 2022 sports events in the United Kingdom
2022 Nottingham Open
 in English women's sport